Everfound was a Christian-rock band based in Denver, Colorado, consisting of three brothers, Ruslan, Nikita, and Yan. The Odnoralov family moved from Russia to Colorado in 1996. Since their formation, they have independently released three EPs and one full length independent album, Colorful Alibis and Scandalous Smiles. They released their national debut, major-label, self-titled album on July 16, 2013, as well as a remix of several songs released exclusively on Spotify, on August 5, 2014, followed by a Christmas EP, Resolution, on November 11.

Saint Nomad 

In 2018 the trio re-branded themselves as Saint Nomad with influences including Tame Impala and Phantogram. Their debut single, "El Dorado", was followed by an album: Momento Mori. In 2020 the trio returned with new single, "Nothing To Lose".

Discography

Studio albums

Studio albums as Saint Nomad

See also 

 Iolite - the band's sister Elina Odnoralov

References

American pop rock music groups
American Christian rock groups
Indie rock musical groups from Colorado
Musical groups established in 2005
Musical groups from Denver
Word Records artists